Rachel LeeAnn Fox (born October 1, 1991) is an American softball coach and former player. She is currently the assistant coach at Samford.

Career
She attended Fort Bend Christian Academy in Sugar Land, Texas, graduating in 2010. Fox later attended the University of Texas at Austin for two years, before transferring to Texas A&M University. At both universities, she pitched on the school's respective college softball teams. After graduating from Texas A&M, Fox played professional softball with the Scrap Yard Dawgs of National Pro Fastpitch, while serving as a graduate assistant softball coach at Mississippi State University from 2016 to 2017.

Coaching career
She later served as the pitching coach at the University of the Incarnate Word in 2018. On August 8, 2018, Fox was named an assistant softball coach at Samford University.

References

External links
 
 Samford bio
 Incarnate Word bio
 Mississippi State bio
 Texas A&M bio
 Texas bio

1991 births
Living people
American softball coaches
Mississippi State Bulldogs softball coaches
Incarnate Word Cardinals coaches
Samford Bulldogs softball coaches
Texas Longhorns softball players
Texas A&M Aggies softball players
Scrap Yard Dawgs players
People from Sugar Land, Texas